Jin Ye (born November 28, 1988, in Shijiazhuang, Hebei) is a Chinese dancer, model and beauty pageant titleholder who was crowned as Miss Universe China in 2013 session and represented her country at the Miss Universe 2013 pageant in Russia.

Early life
Jin is a model in Hebei. In her spare time, she enjoys reading, dancing and photography. She competed for Miss China World in 2009, 2011, 2013, but did not place. She is good friends with Miss China World 2013 Yu Weiwei who also competed  Miss China World in 2009, 2011, and 2013.

Miss Universe China 2013
Jin was crowned by the previous year's winner, Diana Xu, Miss Universe China 2012. The pageant finale was on September 28, 2013, and was held at Jing An Shangri-La Hotel in Shanghai.

Miss Universe 2013
Jin competed at Miss Universe 2013 in Moscow, Russia where she finished in the Top 16. She was the third Chinese woman to place at Miss Universe. She was also chosen by her fellow contestants as Miss Congeniality and was awarded a $1,000 cash prize and a gift from Diamond Nexus.

References

External links
 Official Miss China website

1988 births
Living people
Chinese beauty pageant winners
Miss Universe 2013 contestants
People from Shijiazhuang